Inspiration Glacier is on the east slopes of Eldorado Peak, North Cascades National Park in the U.S. state of Washington. Inspiration Glacier lies in a cirque with Eldorado Peak to the west, the arête known as Tepeh Towers to the northwest and Klawatti Peak to the northeast. Inspiration Glacier is connected to the Eldorado Glacier to the south and partially separated by the Tepeh Towers from the McAllister Glacier to the north. Meltwaters from Inspiration Glacier flow into Moraine Lake.

See also
List of glaciers in the United States

References

Glaciers of the North Cascades
Glaciers of Skagit County, Washington
Glaciers of Washington (state)